Khandaker Anwarul Haque is a Bangladeshi politician and former member of parliament.

Early life
Anwarul Haque was born in Jatbari village of Madhupur Upazila of Tangail district. His father's name Khandaker Azizur Rahman and mother's name Khadija Begum. In the course of his education, he obtained a post-graduate degree from Dhaka University.

Career
While studying at Dhaka University Anwarul Haque joined the student politics. He was a member of the Dhaka University Central Student Parliament. Anwarul Haque won the fourth parliamentary election in 1988 from Tangail-1 constituency as an Independent politician. After being elected a member of parliament, he joined the Jatiya Party (Ershad). After joining the Jatiya Party for some time, he joined the BNP and At present, he is acting as advisor to the BNP's Madhupur Upazila branch.

References

Bangladesh Nationalist Party politicians
Living people
4th Jatiya Sangsad members
Year of birth missing (living people)